The Lighthouse of Genoa (or simply Lanterna), is the main lighthouse for the city's port. Besides being an important aid to night navigation in the vicinity, the tower serves as a symbol and a landmark for the City of Genoa. Built of masonry, at  it is the world's fifth tallest lighthouse and the second tallest "traditional" one. Between 1543 and the construction of the lighthouse on Île Vierge, France in 1902, it was the tallest lighthouse in the world.

It is constructed in two square portions, each one capped by a terrace; the whole structure is crowned by a lantern from which the light is shone. Rebuilt in its current shape in 1543 replacing the former lighthouse, it is the world's third oldest lighthouse, following the Tower of Hercules in A Coruña, Spain, and Kõpu Lighthouse, on the island of Hiiumaa, Estonia.

History of the tower

Location
The Lanterna is on the hill of San Benigno at some little distance from the Sampierdarena neighborhood. The cape on which the Lanterna stands was at one time a peninsula before the nearby coastline was filled in and reshaped. To the west, it marked the entrance to the original port of Genoa, today the Porto Antico.  Over time, the hill on the cape assumed the name "Capo di Faro", or "Lighthouse Cape"; it is also sometimes referred to as the cape of San Benigno, after the convent that once stood there.  Today, the hill is gone save for a small rise upon which the lighthouse stands; the rest of it was removed to provide infill for other areas of the city.

Medieval light
The first tower at this location, a structure formed of three crenellated towers, was built, most sources say, around 1128, although at least one states that it was built in 1161.  At the time it sat close to the main coastal road, called the Via di Francia, which more recent documents describe as passing between it and the sea.  When it was constructed the tower was fairly far from the city; it was only in the seventeenth century that it became part of the so-called "Cerchia Seicentesca", part of the seicento, the walls of Genoa. It has remained a part of the system until today.

Dried pieces of erica and juniper wood were used to fuel the signal fire in its early years; for upkeep, navigators who used the port were expected to pay a tax upon their approach to the city.  The tower also played a part, early in its career, in the ongoing feud between the Guelphs and Ghibellines; during one battle, the Ghibellines damaged it considerably during an attempt to dislodge a group of Guelphs who had taken refuge inside.  In 1318 and again in 1321, it was decided to dig a defensive trench around the tower, the better to protect it from damage in battle.  In 1326 the first oil-based lantern, whose fire was fed by olive oil, was added to the structure, so that incoming vessels could better distinguish the signal fire upon approach.  For the same reason, in 1340 the tower was painted with the coat of arms of the city, the better to serve as a distinctive daymark.  In around 1400 the lighthouse was further converted for use as a prison; among the hostages therein accommodated were the king of Cyprus, James II, and his wife.

In 1405 the priests who were responsible for the upkeep of the lighthouse placed on its cupola a fish and a golden cross to serve as symbols of Christianity.  During the cinquecento the structure was heavily damaged again, this time by friendly fire from the Genovese against the French.  Thirty years later, in 1543, the tower was once again reconstructed, assuming the form in which it may still be seen today.

In 1449 one of the keepers of the lighthouse was listed as Antonio Colombo, uncle of explorer Christopher Columbus.

Modern history
The tower was shelled during the bombardment of Genoa by the French in 1684; the windows which were damaged were replaced on the orders of Louis XIV in 1692.  In 1778 construction began on a new lighting system designed to counteract damage done to the lighting apparatus over several centuries of use.  In 1840 a rotating Fresnel lens  was installed; the system was formally inaugurated in January 1841.  It was modified up until the end of the century in order to increase its capability; the entire lighthouse was modernised again in 1913, but the electrification was poorly done, and had to be refitted in 1936.  One last major restoration project, begun after American and British air attacks of World War II, was completed in 1956. It is also the symbol surrounding the Derby della Lanterna between two football clubs, Genoa C.F.C. and U.C. Sampdoria.

Lanterna Museum
Adjacent to the tower is the Museo della Lanterna, which may be reached by a walk from the old city walls to the foot of the beacon at the via Milano.  It is also accessible from the neighboring Genova-Ovest highway.  Work on the facility was completed in 2004, and the museum was opened to the public in 2006; at the same time a new entry door was installed in the lighthouse.  Further restoration involved replacement of some decorative elements on the attic of the tower and systematic paving, in stone, of the accessway.  The city park to the north has also been rehabilitated.

The museum mainly covers the history of the city and the port, and contains a good deal of archival material.  Some of the displays also cover the history of navigation and navigational aids in Genoa, and describe various signaling systems that have been used at sea.  Part of a Fresnel lens, similar to that found in the lighthouse itself, is shown in such a manner as to display its inner workings.  In addition to the permanent displays, temporary exhibits are also sometimes shown at the museum.

The tower has been struck by lightning several times in its career.  The most serious occasion, in 1481, led to the death of one of its guardians.  In 1602 lightning demolished a part of the crenellation on the top tower, and in 1603 another strike, again on the same tower, hit a decorative marble tablet with the text Jesus Christus rex venit in pace et Deus Homo factus est(Jesus Christ king came in peace, and God became Man).  This tablet may still be seen today; it is mounted on the ground at the base of the top tower.

At one time the lighthouse worked in tandem with a smaller tower, posted at the other end of the harbor where the cotton warehouses in the Porto Antico now stand.

Management
Management of the tower is under the authority of the Lighthouse Command Zone of the Marina Militare, and is directed from its center in La Spezia, which oversees all of the lighthouses in the region.  The Marina Militare has been responsible for all lights on the Italian coast since 1910, and employs both military and civil technicians for the purpose.

Image gallery

See also
 List of lighthouses in Italy
 List of tallest lighthouses in the world

Bibliography
 La Lanterna, storie e leggende del Faro più famoso del mondo, Editrice Il Golfo, 2000.

Notes and references

This article was based on a translation of the corresponding article in the Italian Wikipedia.

External links

 Homepage for the Museo della Lanterna
 Genova faro Marina Militare

Genoa
Buildings and structures in Genoa
Lighthouse museums
Maritime museums in Italy
Museums in Genoa
12th-century establishments in the Republic of Genoa
Medieval Italian architecture
1128 establishments in Europe
Buildings and structures completed in 1128
Lighthouses completed in the 12th century
Towers completed in the 12th century
Buildings and structures completed in 1543
Lighthouses completed in 1543
Towers completed in the 16th century
Tourist attractions in Genoa
People from Sampierdarena